Euxesta albitarsis is a species of ulidiid or picture-winged fly in the genus Euxesta of the family Tephritidae.

References

albitarsis
Insects described in 1838